Wilderness School is an independent, non-denominational Christian, day and boarding school for girls, located in Medindie, an inner northern suburb of Adelaide, South Australia.

Established by the Brown sisters in 1884 with four girls and one small boy, Andrew Muecke, as students, Wilderness is a Reception to Year 12 school, and also caters for Year 13. The school currently enrols approximately 820 students, including up to 80 boarders. In 2003, The Australian declared The Wilderness School one of the ten highest achieving schools in Australia.

Wilderness School is affiliated with the Association of Heads of Independent Schools of Australia (AHISA), the Junior School Heads Association of Australia (JSHAA), the Australian Boarding Schools' Association, the Alliance of Girls' Schools Australasia (AGSA) and the Independent Girls' Schools Sports Association (IGSSA).

House system 
The Wilderness School has five houses, through which all girls partake in intra-school activities:
Amaryllis (Pink)
Antholiza (Blue)
Carob (Green)
Cedar (Purple)
Sparaxis (Orange)

Sport
Wilderness School is a member of the Independent Girls Schools Sports Association (IGSSA). The school maintains the sporting grounds at Park 6 on Robe Terrace, for use as hockey, lacrosse and soccer fields. Other sporting facilities include a gymnasium which was completed in 2005, and a boatshed at the South Australian Rowing Association complex at West Lakes for rowing.

IGSSA premierships 
Wilderness school has won the following IGSSA premierships.

 Badminton (3) - 2009, 2014, 2015
 Hockey (7) - 1981, 1982, 1998, 2002, 2005, 2006, 2019
 Swimming - 2010

Notable alumnae
Annabel Crabb – the ABC's chief online political writer, formerly political columnist with The Age
Ally Fowler – Actress
Posie Graeme-Evans – Novelist; Producer; Director of Drama, Nine Network; Co-creator of Hi-5 and McLeod's Daughters (also attended The Fahan School)
 Georgie Parker, member of the Australian National Hockey Team.
 Mekhla Kumar, Australian pianist
 Phiala E. Shanahan, theoretical physicist
 Susan Magarey, historian and author

See also
List of schools in South Australia
List of boarding schools

References

External links
Wilderness School Website

Girls' schools in South Australia
High schools in South Australia
Educational institutions established in 1884
Boarding schools in South Australia
Nondenominational Christian schools in Adelaide
Junior School Heads Association of Australia Member Schools
Private primary schools in Adelaide
1884 establishments in Australia